The Sokolovsky gypsy choir (Russian "Соколовский хор") was founded by Count Orlov-Chesmensky in the 1770s who called on Ivan Sokolov, leader of the Roma among his serfs, to perform at his estate outside Moscow. The enslaved Roma people were granted their freedom in 1807, and Sokolov became the first in a dynasty of Roma choir leaders. The choir performed at the prestigious Yar restaurant in Moscow ("Соколовский хор у Яра"). When his descendant Grigory Sokolov died leadership passed to Nikolai Shishkin. Many staples of the Russian traditional romans song have Roma origins.

Leaders of the choir
 Ivan Trofimovich Sokolov (Иван Трофимович Соколов 1740s-1807) patriarch and founder of the choir.
 Ilya Sokolov (Илья Соколов)
 Grigory Sokolov
 Nikolai Shishkin

References

Russian choirs
Romani musical groups
Romani in Russia
1770s establishments in the Russian Empire